George Parker Winship (29 July 1871 – 22 June 1952) was an American librarian, author, teacher, and bibliographer born in Bridgewater, Massachusetts.  He graduated from Harvard in 1893.

Early life and career 
Went from the Somerville Latin School to Harvard College, where he received an A.B cum laude in 1893 and an A.M. in 1894. He was librarian of a private collection of Americana formed by John Carter Brown at Providence, Rhode Island, from 1895 to 1915. Winship's interest in contemporary fine printing was to some extent connected with the Club of Odd Volumes in Boston, of which he became a non-resident member in 1898. Winship was also elected a member of the American Antiquarian Society in 1899.

In 1915 Winship became librarian of the Harry Elkins Widener collection, which had just opened. He was also appointed a lecturer on the history of printing and championed the use of rare books in education. In 1926, he became Assistant Librarian of Widener's Treasure Room, which held Harvard's most precious rare books and manuscripts. Winship remained at Harvard until his retirement in 1936; he died in 1952.

Winship  was a scholar as well as a librarian. He edited a number of historical works and published:  The Coronado Expedition (1896);  John Cabot (1898);  Geoffrey Chaucer (1900);  Cabot Bibliography (1900);  William Caxton (1909);  Printing in South America (1912); and The John Carter Brown Library (1914).

Winship's father was American educator Albert Edward Winship; a brother was The Boston Globe editor Laurence L. Winship.

Publications
The Coronado Expedition (1896)
John Cabot (1898)
Geoffrey Chaucer (1900)
Cabot Bibliography (1900)
William Caxton (1909)
Printing in South America (1912)
The John Carter Brown Library (1914)
Sailors Narratives of Voyages Along the New England Coast, 1524–1634 (1905)
The Cambridge Press 1638–1692 (1946)

References

  George Parker Winship as Librarian, Typophile, and Teacher -Edited by Roger Stoddard
 American National Biography entry

External links
 
 
 The journey of Coronado, 1540-1542, from the city of Mexico to the Grand Canon of the Colorado and the buffalo plains of Texas, Kansas and Nebraska, as told by himself and his followers, written by Pedro de Castañeda and translated by George Parker Winship, 1922 publication, hosted by the Portal to Texas History.
 Sailors Narratives of Voyages Along the New England Coast, 1524-1624 at Project Gutenberg

American librarians
Harvard University alumni
People from Bridgewater, Massachusetts
Members of the American Antiquarian Society
1871 births
1952 deaths
Historians from Massachusetts
Brown University staff